Miyumi is a Japanese feminine given name. 

It may refer to:

People
 Miyumi Suzuki - creator of Wandering Sun

Fictional characters
 Scooby-Doo! and the Samurai Sword

Other
The Miyumi Project, a blend of music with different ethnic backgrounds, highlighting contributions from Japanese taiko drumming in the framework of jazz music

References

Japanese feminine given names